Creative journalism refers to a journalistic story than has been enhanced in a creative way by the journalist, possibly with an intent to mislead or with an objective to cause an event to happen that otherwise would not.

Etymology

Creative journalism has sometimes been applied to newly identified genres until a definitive designated is settled upon.

Meanings

Linking creative writing and journalism

One usage of the term creative journalism is to cover an overlap between creating writing and journalism that occurs in the feature writing, narrative literature and whatever.  Journalism is the factual portrayal of news and events with minimal analysis and interpretation.  By contrast creative is original expressive and imaginative. Creative writing refers to imagination

The UNICEF indicated it wished to celebrate creative journalism by was of the Meena Media award, though the award is mainly divided into creative and journalistic categories.

Created story

Hugh Cudlipp has defined creative journalism differently, as the art of causing something to occur that would not otherwise materialise and the antithesis of the phantom scoop where the foretold event does not occur.  He also puts it as making news not faking news  This definition has been alluded to by others.

Creative presentation

Creative journalism can be applied to a journalistic work that has creative presentation.  Used this way if will often be used to denote a praiseworthy example of photojournalism, visual journalism or graphic journalism.

Euphemism

The euphemism for Creative journalism refers to the similar use of 'creative' in creative accounting.  Here creative is used in the sense to mislead. The term has elements of relationship to tabloid journalism, yellow journalism and fakes news, though there are differences in emphasis and objectives.  A significant difference from clickbait is the former but form emphasis on the story.

What creative journalism is not

Creative journalism does not occur when the source(s) are incorrect or as a result of spin propaganda providing the journalist has not knowingly colluded or negligently failed to check sources.

References

Deception
Disinformation
Newswriting
Criticism of journalism
Communication of falsehoods